The 1991 Five Nations Championship was the 62nd series of the Five Nations Championship, an annual rugby union competition between the major Northern Hemisphere rugby union national teams. The tournament consisted of ten matches held between 19 January and 16 March 1991.

The tournament was the 62nd in its then format as the Five Nations. Including the competition's former incarnation as the Home Nations Championship, the 1991 Five Nations Championship was the 97th Northern Hemisphere rugby union championship.

The championship was contested by England, France, Ireland, Scotland and Wales. England won the tournament, achieving a final 21–19 victory over France to win the Grand Slam, their first since 1980 and ninth overall in the Five Nations. This was also their nineteenth outright victory, including five victories in the Home Nations, excluding ten titles shared with other countries. England also won the Triple Crown and Calcutta Cup as a result of their victories over the other Home Nations. France and Scotland placed second and third with three and two wins respectively, while Ireland and Wales placed fourth and fifth without achieving any victories; the fixture between the two teams resulted in a 21–21 draw.

It was also the fourth occasion, after 1978, 1984 and 1990, on which two teams each with three victories faced off against each other in the final round of matches, with both capable of completing a Grand Slam with a victory. France lost on their third attempt.

This edition was also famous for the try Philippe Saint-André scored in the last match of the tournament against England, which was later voted Twickenham's try of the century.

Participants
The teams involved were:

Squads

Table

Results

References

Five Nations
Six Nations Championship seasons
Five Nations
Five Nations
Five Nations
Five Nations
Five Nations
 
Five Nations
Five Nations
Five Nations